Stephen Hayes (26 December 1902 – 28 December 1974) was a member and leader of the Irish Republican Army from April 1939 to June 1941.

Early life
Hayes was born in Enniscorthy, County Wexford. During the Irish War of Independence, he was commandant of the Wexford Brigade of Fianna Éireann. He took the Anti-Treaty side during the Irish Civil War, during which he was interned. During the 1936 legislative period of the 8th Dáil Hayes was one of two candidates representing the Irish republican political party Cumann Poblachta na hÉireann. In the Wexford by-election and polled a 2.85 percent share of the vote.

Hayes was active in Gaelic Athletic Association circles in Wexford. In 1925, he helped Wexford win the Leinster Senior Football title. He also served as secretary to the county board for ten years, from the 1920s to 1930s.

IRA activities

Hayes joined the IRA and was on the IRA Army Council in January 1939 when it declared war on the British government.

When IRA chief of staff Seán Russell departed on IRA business to the United States (and subsequently to Nazi Germany), Hayes became IRA Chief of Staff. His time in office was marred by controversy and it is widely believed that he served as an informer to the Irish Police - the Garda Síochána.

Hayes had sent a plan for the invasion of Northern Ireland by German troops to Germany in April 1940. This plan later became known as Plan Kathleen. He is also known to have met with German agent Hermann Görtz on 21 May 1940 in Dublin shortly after the latter's parachuting into Ireland on 5 May 1940 as part of Operation Mainau. Hayes is known to have asked Görtz for money and arms to wage a campaign in Northern Ireland, although shortly after this meeting the original Plan Kathleen was discovered. The discovery of the plan led to the acceleration of joint British and Irish military planning for a German invasion known as Plan W.

On 15 August 1940 Hayes organized meeting of senior IRA men at an address on Rathgar Road, Dublin (Hayes was not in attendance). The meeting was raided by police and resulted in a gun battle in which two Detectives were killed and one wounded. Senior IRA men Paddy McGrath and Tom Harte were arrested, charged with the murders and tried by Military Tribunal, established under the Emergency Powers Act 1939. They challenged the legislation in the High Court, seeking a writ of habeas corpus, and ultimately appealed to the Supreme Court. They were represented in the courts by Seán MacBride. The appeal was unsuccessful, and they were executed by firing squad at Dublin's Mountjoy Prison on 6 September 1940. At the time of these arrests Hayes was the IRA Chief of Staff. In his written confession Hayes admits to providing the address of the meeting to government officials which resulted in the capture of Harte and McGrath.

On 30 June 1941, Northern-based IRA men kidnapped Hayes, accusing him of being a spy for the Irish Free State government.  Hayes was court-martialed by senior IRA men - Charlie McCarthy from Cork, Tom Farrell from Connemara and Pearse Kelly from Tyrone.  By his own account, he was tortured and court-martialed for treason by his comrades, and would have been executed, but he bought himself time composing an enormously long confession.  He managed to escape on 8 September 1941 and handed himself in to the Garda for protection. The Officer Commanding (O/C) of the IRA's Northern Command, Seán McCaughey (who was the prosecutor at Hayes court-martial), was arrested and later convicted (18 September 1941) for the Hayes kidnapping. After a long hunger and thirst strike in Portlaoise prison, McCaughey died on 11 May 1946.

Hayes was later sentenced to five years' imprisonment by the Special Criminal Court on account of his IRA activities. Upon his release and until his death Hayes held that his confession was fiction, made under duress and torture. The controversy surrounding the confession of Hayes was never authoritatively settled.

Within IRA circles, Hayes is still considered a traitor and an informer. One of the main allegations against him was that he informed the Garda Síochána about IRA arms dumps in Wexford. However, this was later blamed on a Wexford man named Michael Deveraux, an officer of the Wexford Battalion of the IRA who was subsequently abducted and executed by an IRA squad in County Tipperary on Hayes’ orders. George Plant, a Protestant IRA veteran, was later executed in Portlaoise for Devereux's murder.

Later life
After his release, Hayes resumed his clerical position at Wexford County Council.

He died in Enniscorthy on 28 December 1974.

See also
 IRA Abwehr World War II - Main article on IRA Abwehr links

References

External links
 Time Magazine article on the abduction of Stephen Hayes

1902 births
1974 deaths
Gaelic football people
Irish Republican Army (1922–1969) members
People of the Irish Civil War (Anti-Treaty side)
People from County Wexford
Wexford GAA
IRA collaborators with Nazi Germany